The 1981–82 Australia rugby union tour of Britain and Ireland was a series of matches played by the Australia national rugby union team (nicknamed the Wallabies). The touring team played twenty-three matches between October 1981 and January 1982, winning sixteen games, drawing one and losing six. The scheduled final game, against the Barbarians, was cancelled due to heavy snow.

The team played four international matches but were successful in only one, against . Although they scored more tries than their opponents in each of the four internationals, the home teams' goal-kicking proved more reliable in every case.

Outside the international programme, the Wallabies won only once in their opening four matches. They lost to the English Midlands Division in the opening match, were held to a draw by the English Northern Division in the third match and lost to Bridgend in the fourth match. They then beat Wales B (the national second-tier side) by a single point in the next game. The sixth game brought a much better performance with a 37–6 win over Pontypool. Their form improved somewhat after that and they lost only one of the remaining thirteen non-international matches, to Munster in Cork.

The tour experience would prove invaluable however for a number of brilliantly talented young players who in 1984 would lead the Wallabies to a Grand Slam tour victory.
The Ella brothers, Steve Williams, Simon Poidevin, Andrew Slack, Brendan Moon, Michael Hawker and Roger Gould all in this 1981–82 tour gave a preview of great days ahead and of Australia's eventual coming of age as a world-class rugby nation.

The squad's leadership
The tour manager was Sir Nicholas Shehadie a 30 Test veteran and former Wallaby captain. He was at the time Chairman of the New South Wales Rugby Union and President of Australian Rugby Union. He had recently stepped down after fifteen years in local government public office including three years as the 75th Lord Mayor of Sydney.  The coach was Bob Templeton.

Tour captain was Tony Shaw, the first Queenslander since Bill McLean in 1947–48 to captain Australia in the UK. Shaw would later marry McLean's daughter and made the 81–82 tour alongside Bill's son Peter and nephew Paul. Mark Loane would captain the side in the Test against England when Shaw was dropped from the team following the Scottish Test. Shaw had retaliated recklessly to niggling from Scots player Bill Cuthbertson with a king-hit right in front of the referee. Shaw was to pay dearly for this as it would mark the end of his Test captaincy career.

The tour
The tour was dogged by appalling weather: cold, rain and snow. The Australian players brought up on firm, fast playing surfaces were shackled in ankle-deep mud. After a training mishap hooker Bruce Malouf returned home with a broken leg without having played a match. Veteran half-back John Hipwell missed many games through persistent injuries.

So much had been expected of the Wallaby side and following the tour many reasons were offered up to explain the disappointing result of one international won from the four played. It was said that Paul McLean's kicking was not up to his usual standard; that the scrum lacked size and power; that Tony Shaw showed his pique in felling Cuthbertson and that the loss of Hipwell was a blow. Regardless of the reasons some bad luck was evident in the cancellation of the Barbarian clash due to heavy snow caused by the 1981–82 United Kingdom cold wave and perhaps symptomatic of much ill-luck on the tour. The journalist David Lord, who travelled with the squad, wrote venomously of a Queensland-New South Wales player rift in the team which if even half-true must have affected team morale.

Matches of the tour
Scores and results list Australia's points tally first.

Test matches

Ireland

Australia's victory was based on a magnificent defensive display. Ireland's front five won more ball than Australia but Australia's tackling and speed to the loose ball proved decisive. Paul McLean opened the scoring with an 11th-minute penalty goal and Roger Gould doubled the lead soon after with a dropped goal. McLean extended the lead to 9–0 with a further penalty before Tony Ward's penalty goal finally put Ireland on the board. Just before half-time McLean's third penalty put Australia 12–3 ahead.  Ward cut the lead to 12–6 with a second penalty but O'Connor scored the only try of the game to make it 16–6 to Australia. Ward reduced their lead again with two more penalties but Australia hung on to win 16–12.

AUSTRALIA: Roger Gould, Michael O'Connor, Andrew Slack, Michael Hawker, Brendan Moon, Paul McLean, John Hipwell, John Meadows, Chris Carberry, Tony D'Arcy, Tony Shaw (c), Peter McLean, Simon Poidevin, Greg Cornelsen, Mark Loane. 

IRELAND: Hugo MacNeill, Trevor Ringland, David Irwin, Paul Dean, Terry Kennedy, Tony Ward, Robbie McGrath, Phil Orr, John Cantrell, Mick Fitzpatrick, Brendan Foley, Donal Lenihan, John O'Driscoll, Fergus Slattery (c), Willie Duggan

Wales

Australia scored two tries to Wales's one but were beaten by a powerful performance by the Welsh pack, in which new cap Moriarty was outstanding. Goal-kicking was a significant difference between the two teams, with Paul McLean missing four of his six kicks at goal. Gwyn Evans opened the scoring with a penalty goal for Wales with Paul McLean equalising in kind soon after. Slack then scored a try after Holmes had been bundled off the ball after incorrectly calling for a mark, although McLean failed to convert. Evans scored a second penalty to make the half-time score 7–6 to Australia. In the second half, Mitchell Cox scored a try in the corner with McLean converting to make it 13–6. Wales replied almost immediately with a try from Moriarty after a 30-metre run from Rees and Evans' conversion made the score 13–12. Davies, captaining Wales for the first time, dropped a goal to put Wales ahead 15–13 before Evans' third penalty goal made the final score 18–13.

AUSTRALIA: Roger Gould, Mitchell Cox, Andrew Slack (c), Michael Hawker (rep Mick Martin 48 min), Brendan Moon, Paul McLean, John Hipwell (rep Phillip Cox 65 min), Tony D'Arcy, Chris Carberry, Declan Curran, Tony Shaw (c), Peter McLean, Simon Poidevin, Greg Cornelsen, Mark Loane. 

WALES: Gwyn Evans, Robert Ackerman, Patrick Daniels, Alun Donovan, Clive Rees, Gareth Davies (c), Terry Holmes, Ian Stephens, Alan Phillips, Graham Price, Richard Moriarty, Geoff Wheel, Mark Davies, Gareth Williams, Jeff Squire

Scotland

Disaster struck in the Scotland Test for Wallaby captain Tony Shaw. He was questioning referee Quittenton when the Scottish lock Bill Cuthbertson kept niggling him. Shaw turned and hit Cuthbertson with a right, flooring him in front of the referee and the TV cameras. That moment marked the end of his Wallaby captaincy.

Australia scored three tries, all in the first half, to Scotland's one, but were beaten largely due to the fine goal-kicking of Andy Irvine, who scored a then-record 17 points for Scotland. Irvine scored three consecutive penalty goals to put Scotland 9–0 up but his charged-down kick allowed Poidevin to score an unconverted try. A second unconverted try for Moon followed, bringing the scores to 9–8, before Slack's try put Australia ahead for the first time at 12–9. McLean and Irvine traded penalties to make the score 15–12 to the Wallabies at half-time. Irvine levelled the scores at the start of the second half with his fifth penalty goal and Rutherford's dropped goal put Scotland back in the lead. Gould's failure to gather Rutherford's kick and a kindly bounce gave a try to Renwick near the posts which Irvine converted to give Scotland their 24–15 win. The game was clean apart from the Shaw-Cuthbertson incident.

AUSTRALIA: Roger Gould, Mitchell Cox, Andrew Slack, Paul McLean, Brendan Moon, Mark Ella, Phillip Cox, John Meadows, Chris Carberry, Tony D'Arcy, Tony Shaw (c), Peter McLean, Simon Poidevin, Greg Cornelsen, Mark Loane. 

SCOTLAND:  Andy Irvine (c), Keith Robertson, Jim Renwick, David Johnston, Roger Baird, John Rutherford, Roy Laidlaw, Jim Aitken, Colin Deans, Iain Milne, Bill Cuthbertson, Alan Tomes, Jim Calder, David Leslie, Iain Paxton

England

For the fourth time in as many internationals, Australia scored more tries than their opponents but were beaten by superior goal-kicking. The England pack gave a powerful display with an outstanding performance by Colclough.

Rose's two early penalty goals, with one by Paul McLean in between, gave England a 6–3 lead at half-time. Moon then scored after a loose ball was hacked downfield by the backs to put Australia 7–6 ahead going into the final quarter of the match, although McLean failed to convert. When Mark Ella was caught near his own line the England forwards drove on and Jeavons scored from the maul. Dodge kicked the conversion to put England 12–7 up. Rose extended the lead to 15–7 with his third penalty goal before Moon scored his second try, near the corner. McLean missed with the kick (his fourth miss from five attempts at goal) but it was too late to affect the final result, 15–11 to England.

The match was also notable for the half-time appearance of the streaker, Erica Roe.

AUSTRALIA: Paul McLean, Michael O'Connor, Andrew Slack (c), Michael Hawker, Brendan Moon, Mark Ella, John Hipwell, John Meadows, Chris Carberry, Tony D'Arcy, Steve Williams, Peter McLean, Simon Poidevin, Greg Cornelsen, Mark Loane (c).  

ENGLAND: Marcus Rose, John Carleton, Clive Woodward, Paul Dodge, Mike Slemen (rep Nick Stringer 63 min), Huw Davies, Steve Smith, Colin Smart, Peter Wheeler, Gary Pearce, Bill Beaumont (c), Maurice Colclough, Nick Jeavons, Peter Winterbottom, Bob Hesford

Other matches

Midland Division

Oxford University

Northern Division

Bridgend

Wales B

Pontypool

London Division

Devon and Cornwall

Ulster

Munster

Leicester

Swansea

Pontypridd

Lancashire

Glasgow

Scottish North and Midlands

South and South-West Division

Combined Services

West Wales

Barbarians

Touring party
Coach : Bob Templeton
Tour Manager: Sir Nicholas Shehadie
Captain: Tony Shaw

Squad
Tour appearances include appearances as a replacement, which are shown in brackets e.g. (1R)

References

Sources
 Howell, Max (2005) Born to Lead – Wallaby Test Captains, Celebrity Books, Auckland NZ
 Shehadie, Nicholas (2003) A Life Worth Living, Simon & Schuster Australia

1981 rugby union tours
1982 rugby union tours
1981-82
1981-82
1981-82
1981-82
1981-82
1981 in Australian rugby union
1982 in Australian rugby union
1981–82 in European rugby union
1981–82 in English rugby union
1981–82 in Welsh rugby union
1981–82 in Scottish rugby union
1981–82 in Irish rugby union
November 1981 sports events in Europe
December 1981 sports events in Europe
January 1982 sports events in Europe
October 1981 sports events in Europe